Bryan Neck Presbyterian Church is a historic Presbyterian church on a 2-acre tract on Belfast Keller Road in Keller, Georgia. The historic district includes a manse (built in 1939) and a cemetery.  The inside of the church has varnished tongue-and-grove wood paneling in different orientations to form decorative patterns.  Many of the interior furnishings are original.  It was built in 1885 and was added to the National Register of Historic Places in 2000.

See also
 National Register of Historic Places listings in Bryan County, Georgia

References

External links
 

Presbyterian churches in Georgia (U.S. state)
Churches on the National Register of Historic Places in Georgia (U.S. state)
Colonial Revival architecture in Georgia (U.S. state)
Churches completed in 1885
Buildings and structures in Bryan County, Georgia
National Register of Historic Places in Bryan County, Georgia